Rudolf Ernst "Rudy" Monk Sofia (26 January 1936 – August 2013) was a Dutch Antillean weightlifter. He competed at the 1960 Summer Olympics, the 1964 Summer Olympics and the 1968 Summer Olympics.

References

External links
 

1936 births
2013 deaths
Dutch Antillean male weightlifters
Olympic weightlifters of the Netherlands Antilles
Weightlifters at the 1960 Summer Olympics
Weightlifters at the 1964 Summer Olympics
Weightlifters at the 1968 Summer Olympics
Place of birth missing
Weightlifters at the 1963 Pan American Games
Pan American Games medalists in weightlifting
Pan American Games silver medalists for the Netherlands Antilles
Medalists at the 1963 Pan American Games